

The CAMS 53 was a transport flying boat built in France in the late 1920s.  Building on the experience gained from the unsuccessful CAMS 51, Maurice Hurel designed an aircraft of similar size and capacity for Aéropostale.  The company bought four aircraft straight away for use on its Marseilles-Algiers route, and Air Orient purchased another two.  More CAMS 53s were soon ordered by these operators as well as Air Union, and the aircraft were used to link Marseilles with Ajaccio and Beirut.  When the various French airlines were absorbed into Air France in 1933, some 25 CAMS 53s were still in operation and continued in use until 1935.

Variants
 53 - original production version (seven built)
 53/1 - strengthened hull and increased fuel capacity (12 built, plus all seven original 53s converted)
 53/2 - modified hull shape (six built, one converted from 53 via 53-1)
 53/3 - (redesignated to 56) - version with Gnome et Rhône 9A (licence-built Bristol Jupiter) engines (four built)
 53/4
 53/5
 53R - (originally designated 57) - version with Renault 12Jb liquid-cooled engines (one built)

Operators

Aéropostale
 Air France
Air Orient
Air Union

Specifications (53/1)

References

 
 
 
 

53
1920s French airliners
Flying boats
Biplanes
Twin-engined push-pull aircraft
Aircraft first flown in 1928